Lacticigenium is a Gram-positive, facultatively anaerobic, mesophilic, neutrophilic, non-spore-forming and motile genus of bacteria from the family of Carnobacteriaceae with one known species (L. naphthae).

References

Lactobacillales
Bacteria genera
Monotypic bacteria genera
Taxa described in 2009